Rolando Daniel Sena Ruíz (born February 6, 1990, in Ciudad Victoria, Tamaulipas, Mexico) is a Mexican professional footballer who currently plays as a defender for UAT.

External links
 

Living people
1990 births
Mexican footballers
Association football defenders
Correcaminos UAT footballers
Ascenso MX players
People from Ciudad Victoria
Footballers from Tamaulipas